The Trouble with Girls (and How to Get into It), also known as simply The Trouble with Girls, is a 1969 film directed by  Peter Tewksbury and starring Elvis Presley. It was one of Presley's final acting roles, along with the same year's Change of Habit. It is based on the 1960 novel Chautauqua by Day Keene and Dwight Vincent Babcock.

Plot
In a small Iowa town in 1927, a traveling Chautauqua company arrives, with internal squabbles dividing the troupe. The new manager, Walter Hale (Elvis Presley), is trying to prevent Charlene, the troupe's "Story Lady" (Marlyn Mason), from recruiting the performers to form a union.

Meanwhile, the town has a scandal following the murder of the local pharmacist Wilby (Dabney Coleman). Although a shady gambler is arrested, Walter realizes that the real killer is Nita (Sheree North), one of Wilby's employees.

Walter successfully gets Nita to confess during a Chautauqua performance, where she makes public the sexual harassment that Wilby directed at her. Nita's self-defense plea frees the wrongly jailed man, but Charlene is outraged that Walter used the crime to financially enrich the Chautauqua, and attempts to quit.

Walter attempts to reason with Charlene, but when she refuses to give in, he deceives her and uses the local police force to be sure that she must leave on the train with the rest of the troupe.

Cast
 Elvis Presley as Walter Hale
 Marlyn Mason as Charlene
 Nicole Jaffe as Betty Smith
 Sheree North as Nita Bix
 Edward Andrews as Johnny
 John Carradine as Mr. Drewcolt
 Vincent Price as Mr. Morality
 Dabney Coleman as Harrison Wilby
 Duke Snider as The Cranker
 Anissa Jones as Carol Bix
 John Rubinstein as Princeton College kid
 Frank Welker as Rutgers College kid
 Joyce Van Patten as The Swimmer
 Susan Olsen as Auditioning Singer
 Pepe Brown as Willy

Cast notes
Anissa Jones, best known for playing Buffy on the television program Family Affair, made her only film appearance in The Trouble with Girls.
Nicole Jaffe and Frank Welker went on to become regular members of the voice cast for the Hanna-Barbera Saturday morning cartoon Scooby-Doo, which debuted on CBS ten days after the release of The Trouble with Girls.

Production and release

Development
In June 1959 it was announced that Don Mankiewicz would write a screenplay of an unpublished story by Mauri Grashin, Day Keene, and Dwight Babcock. By December 1960, with the project titled Chautauqua, MGM was ready to make the film with Glenn Ford. Rumours circulating in Hollywood at the time stated that Presley would co-star with Ford, Hope Lange, and Arthur O'Connell, but nothing came of it and the film was shelved.

In 1964, Dick Van Dyke had been signed up to star in a film titled Chautauqua based on a book called Morally We Roll Along by Gay MacLaren. After several years of failed screenplays and cast changes, MGM sold the rights to Columbia Pictures in May 1965. Columbia also struggled to get the project off the ground, and in April 1968 sold the rights back to MGM. This time MGM lined up Presley to star and production began in the fall of 1968. Chautauqua was the working title, but it was later changed to The Trouble with Girls when the producers worried that audiences would not understand the title or be able to pronounce it.

Filming
Elvis Presley was paid $850,000 plus 50% of the profits. Production ran from October 28 to December 18, 1968.

Colonel Tom Parker, Presley's manager, originally wanted actress Jean Hale for the female lead, but Marlyn Mason was cast at the insistence of director Peter Tewksbury. Ironically, Jean Hale's husband, Dabney Coleman, would later be cast.

The Trouble with Girls was released as the bottom half of a double feature, sharing the screen with the Raquel Welch drama Flareup.

Reception
The Trouble with Girls (and How to Get into It) performed poorly in cinemas but strongly on the drive-in circuit.

Roger Greenspun of The New York Times called it "a charming though ineptly titled comedy" with Presley performing "a reasonably developed characterization as the chautauqua company manager, and he sings very well." Variety wrote, "Elvis Presley is lost in this one. Without star’s usual assortment of 10 to 12 songs, and numbers cut down to a bare three, picture has little to offer. Title suggests a gay comedy but it’s a mass of contrived melodramatics and uninteresting performances that do not jell into anything but program fare." Margaret Harford of the Los Angeles Times wrote that the film "never makes up its mind where to go and how to get there ... The trouble with the picture is not girls; it's indecision by the writers, Arnold and Lois Peyser about whether we should laugh at the corny entertainment of 40-odd years ago, or cry over the troubles of a lonely widow who drinks too much." The Monthly Film Bulletin wrote, "The plot's rather curious blend of amateur theatricals, folksy humour and straight melodrama strains credulity even for a Presley film, and the few songs are instantly forgettable. Vincent Price makes an odd and quite appealing guest appearance as an itinerant lecturer known as Mr. Morality, but Presley himself seems uninterested in the whole affair."

Soundtrack
Entering the studio for The Trouble with Girls, Presley found himself in the position of knowing he had the goods in the can with his looming comeback television special but given that his last three singles – "You'll Never Walk Alone," "Your Time Hasn't Come Yet Baby," "A Little Less Conversation" – and the Speedway album all tanked, faced a practically dead recording career. The soundtrack contained some minor songs, its only distinctive track by Billy Strange, the producer of the session, and Mac Davis.

The recording session took place at United Artists Recorders in Hollywood, on October 23, 1968. "Clean Up Your Own Backyard" by Strange and Davis, their fourth successful submission to a Presley soundtrack in a row, was the only one released concurrently with the film's release, as the single RCA 47-9747 in 1969, peaking at #35 on the Billboard Hot 100. "Almost" would appear in 1970 on the budget album Let's Be Friends, the only other track from the film to be released during Presley's lifetime. His remake of the His Hand in Mine track "Swing Down Sweet Chariot" would not see release until 1983 on Elvis: A Legendary Performer Volume 4. The other songs would wait to be issued until RCA's soundtrack compilations of the 1990s combining released songs and outtakes from multiple films on one compact disc.

Tracks
 "Clean Up Your Own Backyard" (Billy Strange and Mac Davis)
 "Swing Down Sweet Chariot" (traditional, arranged by Elvis Presley)
 "Signs of the Zodiac" (Buddy Kaye and Ben Weisman, Duet with Marlyn Mason)
 "Almost" (Buddy Kaye and Ben Weisman)
 "The Whiffenpoof Song" (Ted Galloway, Meade Minnigerode, George Pomeroy; not used in film)
 "Violet (Flower of NYU)" (Steven Dueker and Peter Lohstroh) – The second adaptation in Presley's career of the American Civil War song "Aura Lee" from 1861, the first being the song "Love Me Tender".

Notes
 In some versions of the soundtrack, "Doodle Doo Doo" is included, performed by Linda Sue Risk, who plays Lily-Jeanne, the mayor's daughter. In the film, the song is performed by Anissa Jones, who plays Carol Bix.

Personnel
 Elvis Presley – vocals
 The Blossoms, The Mellomen – backing vocals
 Jack Halloran, Ronald Hicklin, Marilyn Mason – backing vocals
 Roy Caton – trumpet
 Lew McCreary – trombone
 Buddy Collette – clarinet
 Gerry McGee, Joseph Gibbons, Morton Marker – electric guitar
 Don Randi – piano
 Max Bennett – bass
 John Guerin, Frank Carlson – drums

Home media
The Trouble With Girls was released to DVD by Warner Home Video on August 7, 2007, as a Region 1 widescreen DVD.

See also
 List of American films of 1969

References
Notes

Bibliography
Jorgensen, Ernst. Elvis Presley A Life in Music: The Complete Recording Sessions. New York: St. Martin's Press, 1998

External links
 Review 
 
 
 
 Comprehensive review by Chad Plambeck at 3-B Theater
 Review by Jon Danziger at digitallyOBSESSED!, August 2, 2004.
 Review by Bill Treadway at DVD Verdict, July 23, 2004.

1969 films
1969 comedy-drama films
Films based on American novels
Films set in Iowa
Films set in 1927
Films directed by Peter Tewksbury
American comedy-drama films
Metro-Goldwyn-Mayer films
1960s English-language films
1960s American films